Nicola Parry is an Australian actress who is best known for her roles in the hit comedies Thank God You're Here, The Hollowmen and Swift and Shift Couriers. She is an alumna of the London Academy of Music and Dramatic Art. She also appeared as a regular cast member of The Time of Our Lives in the ABC 1 miniseries Sleuth 101, and on the Australian TV comedy show How Not To Behave.

Filmography

References

External links

Alumni of the London Academy of Music and Dramatic Art
Australian television actresses
Living people
Year of birth missing (living people)